Lawrence John Middleton  (27 March 1930 – 10 December 2019) was a  British diplomat.

He was educated at King's College London (BSc, 1951; PhD, 1954) and served as British Ambassador to South Korea from 1986 to 1990.

Honours
  Companion of the Order of St Michael and St George (CMG) – 1985

References

1930 births
2019 deaths
Alumni of King's College London
Ambassadors of the United Kingdom to South Korea
Companions of the Order of St Michael and St George